Puthukkudiyirippu can refer to:

 Puthukkudiyiruppu (Batticaloa) - a town in Batticaloa District, Sri Lanka.
 Puthukkudiyiruppu (Mullaitivu) - a town in Mullaitivu District, Sri Lanka.